Azad Jammu & Kashmir Public Service Commission (AJKPSC) is an agency of the Government of Azad Jammu & Kashmir that is responsible for recruiting civil servants and bureaucrats in Azad Jammu & Kashmir .

History 
After the establishment of Azad Government of the State of Jammu & Kashmir since December 28, 1950, first Rules of Business has been implemented. AJKPSC was launched according of these rules. The first Chairman was Mr. Ghulam Muhayyudin (CSP) Chief Advisor to Ministry of Kashmir Affairs. In March 1967 Azad Jammu & Kashmir Public Service Commission (AJKPSC office shifted in Muzaffarabad city.

Functioning 
At present AJKPSC is functioning under Act 1986,

 To conduct test and examinations for recruitment to the civil services of Azad Jammu & Kashmir and such posts in connection with the affairs of the Government as may be prescribed by rules made under section 11.
 To advise the President on matters relating to qualification for and method of recruitment to, the services and posts referred to in clause (a);and
 Any other matter which the President may refer to the commission.
Most Popular civil posts are Lecturer, Subject Specialists, Medical Officers, Tehsildar/Naib Tehsildar, Assistant Sub Inspectors & Civil Judges.

Composition Of The Commission 
The commission consists of a chairman and the members. The chairman is appointed by the President of Azad Kashmir, in his discretion. The members are appointed by the president on the advice of the Prime Minister of Azad Kashmir . The commission is assisted by the secretary, who provides a link among the commission, its secretariat and the government agencies.

See also 
 Federal Public Service Commission
 Punjab Public Service Commission
 Sindh Public Service Commission
 Khyber Pakhtunkhwa Public Service Commission
 Balochistan Public Service Commission

References

Government agencies of Azad Kashmir
Provincial public service commissions of Pakistan